Gergithus is a genus of planthoppers in the family Issidae. Like all planthoppers, adults feed on plant sap and are capable of escaping by leaping. The genus like other members in the tribe appears somewhat rounded and beetle-like, in some cases, with a mimetic resemblance to ladybird beetles. About 60 species are known in the genus and they are distributed in the Indomalayan and Palearctic Realms.

Description
The genus is closely related to Hemisphaerius but differs in having longer frons (forehead) and legs. The frons also lacks a median keel (carina) or tubercles on the frons, pronotum or mesonotum. The rounded tegmen which resembles the elytra of beetles are often patterned. Although some species show variations in pattern, many species can be recognized on the basis of the patterns.

Species 

Gergithus is a large genus and the list of species includes:

References

External links
 
 Fulgoromorpha database

Hemisphaeriinae
Auchenorrhyncha genera